NA-36 may refer to:

NA-36 (Lakki Marwat), a constituency for the National Assembly of Pakistan
NA-36, a variant of the North American Aviation T-6 Texan aircraft
 Sodium-36 (Na-36 or 36Na), an isotope of sodium